The 2019–20 Serbian Cup season was the fourteenth season of the Serbian national football cup competition. It started on 11 September 2019, and ended on 24 June 2020.

Calendar

Preliminary round
A preliminary round was held in order to reduce the number of teams competing in the first round to 32. It consisted of 2 single-legged ties, with a penalty shoot-out as the decider if the score was tied after 90 minutes.

Round of 32
Draw for the first round took place on 13 September 2019. Matches will be played on 25 and 26 September 2019, with matches including Javor, Voždovac, Red Star and Partizan being postponed to 9 October and 10 October due to their earlier European fixtures. The match between Trepča and Red Star Belgrade was scheduled to take place in North Mitrovica on the 9th of October but was moved to Belgrade and rescheduled as the Red Star team were denied entry to Republic of Kosovo.

Round of 16
The 16 winners from first round will take part in this stage of the competition. The draw was held on 15 October 2019, and it contained seeded and unseeded teams. The seeds were determined by last season's final standings in the Serbian top divisions. Matches will be played on 23 October 2019, with matches including Red Star and Partizan being postponed to 20 November due to their European fixtures.

Quarter-finals

Semi-finals

Final

Top goalscorers

References

External links
 Official site

Serbian Cup seasons
Cup
Serbian Cup
Serbian Cup